Events from the year 1550 in Ireland.

Incumbent
Monarch: Edward VI

Events
February – envoys of the Kingdom of France conclude treaties with O'Neill, O'Donnell and O'Doherty.
June 27 – the English Council resolves to establish a mint in Ireland.
July 17 – grant to Humphrey Powell to start printing in Ireland.
July – instructions issued to Lord Deputy for resumption, surveying and leasing of Leix and Offaly.
Nenagh town and friary burned by O'Carroll.
Craggaunowen Castle built.

Births
James Archer, Jesuit (d. 1620)
Baothghalach Mór Mac Aodhagáin, poet (d. 1600)
William Nugent, rebel nobleman (d. 1625)
Aonghus Ruadh na nAor Ó Dálaigh, poet (d. 1617)
Approximate date
David de Barry, 5th Viscount Buttevant, nobleman (d. 1617)
Tadhg Dall Ó hÚigínn, poet (d. c.1591)
Hugh O'Neill, Earl of Tyrone, rebel nobleman (d. 1616)
Henry Ussher, Church of Ireland Archbishop of Armagh (d. 1613)

Deaths
February 2 – Sir Francis Bryan, courtier, diplomat and lawyer (b. c.1490)
Fearghal mac Domhnuill Ruaidh Mac an Bhaird, poet.
Eoghan Carrach Ó Siadhail, poet (b. c.1500)

References

 
1550s in Ireland
Ireland
Years of the 16th century in Ireland